Sneha Sreekumar (born 9 May 1986) is an Indian actress and dancer who appears in Malayalam films, television serials and theatre dramas. She is best known for playing the character of Mandodari in the TV sitcom Marimayam. She is also a professionally trained dancer with 15 years of experience in dance forms like Mohiniyattam, Kuchipudi, Kathakali, Ottan Thullal, and Bharathanatyam

Biography
Sneha was born on 9 May 1986 to Sreekumar, who works in the Kerala Water Authority and Girija Devi, who was the principal of a school in Kochi. They are settled in Kumbalam, Ernakulam. She has an elder sister Soumya.

Sneha completed her schooling from St. Antony's Higher Secondary School, Ernakulam and did her graduation in Malayalam from Maharaja's College, Ernakulam. Later, she completed her post-graduation from Sree Sankaracharya University of Sanskrit, Kalady in Theatre arts. She also holds a master of philosophy in the performing arts from Mahatma Gandhi University, Kerala.

She is professionally trained in Kathakali from Kalamandalam E. Vasudevan, Ottan Thullal from Kalamandalam Prabhakaran and Mohiniyattam from Nirmala Panicker.

She started off her career through popular TV series Marimayam  playing the role of Mandodari which rose her fame among the Malayali audience.
 She made her debut with Vallatha Pahayan directed by Niyas Backer and later went on to act in several films and her notable roles include in To Noora with Love, Zachariayude Garbhinikal, Rajamma @ Yahoo, Utopiayile Rajavu, Velipadinte Pusthakam to name a few.

She is also hosted the TV show Loudspeaker.

Filmography

Television

 TV Shows as guest/participant

 Ashwamedham 
 Comedy Super Nite
 Super Chef
 Smart Show
 JB Junction
 Aanamalayile Aanappan
 Charutha
 Haritham Sundaram
 Onnum Onnum Moonu
 Let's Rock N Roll
 Panam Tharum Padam
 Super Kudumbam

Theatre
 Play Boy
 Marimankanni
 Spinal Cord
 Hayavadana
 Black Friday
 Poovan Pazham
 The Proposal
 Chayamukhi
 Pralaya Sougandhikam
 Taj Mahal
 Krishna (Music drama)

References

External links

Actresses in Malayalam cinema
Indian film actresses
Actresses from Kerala
Living people
Malayalam comedians
Indian women comedians
Indian television actresses
Actresses in Malayalam television
21st-century Indian actresses
1986 births